George Staples may refer to:

 George McDade Staples (born 1947), American ambassador
 George E. Staples (1918–1993), veterinary researcher in animal nutrition